Messier 60 or M60, also known as NGC 4649, is an elliptical galaxy approximately 57 million light-years away in the equatorial constellation of Virgo. Together with NGC 4647, it forms a pair known as Arp 116. Messier 60 and nearby elliptical galaxy Messier 59 were discovered by Johann Gottfried Koehler in April 1779, observing a comet in the same part of the sky. Charles Messier added both to his catalogue about three days after this.

Characteristics 

This is an elliptical galaxy of type E (E1.5), although some sources class it as S0 – a lenticular galaxy. An E2 class indicates a flattening of 20%, which has a nearly round appearance. The isophotes of the galaxy are boxy in shape, rather than simple ellipses. The mass-to-light ratio is a near constant 9.5 in the V (visual) band of the UBV system. The mass estimated from X-ray emission is  within 5 effective radii.

Supermassive black hole 

At the center of M60 is a supermassive black hole (SMBH) of  billion solar masses, one of the largest ever found. It is currently inactive. X-ray emission from the galaxy shows a cavity created by jets emitted by the hole during past active periods, which correspond to weak radio lobes. The power needed to generate these features is in the range  (ergs per second).

Supernovae 
In 2004, supernova SN 2004W was observed in Messier 60.

Environment 
M60 is the third-brightest giant elliptical galaxy of the Virgo cluster of galaxies, and is the dominant member of a subcluster of four galaxies, the M60 group, which is the closest-known isolated compact group of galaxies. It has several satellite galaxies, one of them being the ultracompact dwarf galaxy M60-UCD1, discovered in 2013. The motion of M60 through the intercluster medium is resulting in ram-pressure stripping of gas from the galaxy's outer halo, beyond a radius of 12 kpc.

NGC 4647 appears approximately 2.5 from Messier 60; the optical disks of the two galaxies overlap. Although this overlap suggests that the galaxies are interacting, photographic images of the two galaxies do not reveal any evidence for gravitational interactions between the two galaxies as would be suggested if the two galaxies were physically close to each other. This suggests that the galaxies are at different distances and are only weakly interacting if at all. However, studies with the Hubble Space Telescope show indications that a tidal interaction may have just begun.

Recession speed and distance estimations 
Messier 60 was the fastest-moving galaxy included in Edwin Hubble's landmark 1929 paper concerning the relationship between recession speed and distance. He used a value of 1090 km/s for the recession speed, 1.8% less than the more recent value of about 1110 km/s (based on a redshift of 0.003726). But he estimated the distance of this galaxy as well as of the three nebulas of the Virgo Cluster which he included (Messier 85, 49, and 87), to be only two million parsecs, rather than the accepted value today of around 16 million parsecs. These errors in distance led him to propose a Hubble constant of 500 km/s/Mpc, whereas the present estimate is around 70 km/s/Mpc.

Gallery

See also
 List of Messier objects
 NGC 7318

References

External links

 StarDate: M60 Fact Sheet
 

Messier 060
Messier 060
Messier 060
Messier 060
Messier 060
060
Messier 060
07898
42831
116
Astronomical objects discovered in 1779